(The) Lilywhites is a nickname of many sports teams, typically because they play in white clothing.

Association football

England
 Berkhamsted Town
 Bromley F.C.
 Cambridge City F.C.
 Faversham Town F.C.
 Fulham F.C.
 Hereford United F.C.
 Leyton F.C.
 Mossley A.F.C.
 Preston North End F.C.
 Tottenham Hotspur F.C.

Elsewhere
 Dundalk F.C., Ireland 
 Clachnacuddin F.C., Scotland 
 Rhyl F.C., Wales
 Eastern Suburbs A.F.C, New Zealand

Other
 Kildare GAA, Gaelic games
 Coldstream Guards, British infantry regiment

See also
 Lillywhites, a sports retail store in London 
 Lily White (disambiguation)